Dhammika Dharmapala (born 1969/1970) is an economist who is the Paul H. and Theo Leffman Professor of Law at the University of Chicago Law School.  He is known for his research into corporate tax avoidance, corporate use of tax havens, and the corporate use of base erosion and profit shifting ("BEPS") techniques.

Biography
Dharmapala was born in Sri Lanka, educated in Australia, and settled in the U.S. (he is a naturalized U.S. citizen), to pursue a career as an academic economist.  He taught economics at the University of Connecticut and law at the University of Illinois, Urbana-Champaign before joining the Chicago faculty in 2014.

Dharmapala's research on tax havens, often with James R. Hines Jr., is cited as important.  In addition to his role as professor at the University of Chicago Law School, Dharmapala is an International Research Fellow at the Oxford University Centre for Business Taxation, and has served on the board of directors of the American Law and Economics Association and the National Tax Association.  Dharmapala is sometimes interviewed in the main U.S. financial media on U.S. corporate tax issues.

Dharmapala tax havens

Dharmapala-Hines 2009 list
Because it is cited as one of the important papers on the research of tax havens, the 48 jurisdictions from the Dharmapala-Hines 2009 paper are listed below, per the markings in the paper (♣ & †):

6 of the 7 tax havens that Dharmapala-Hines identified in 2009, but which have never appeared in any OECD list (e.g. marked as †), namely, Ireland, Luxembourg, the Netherlands, Hong Kong, Singapore and Switzerland, would become ranked in the world's top ten global tax havens, when academics used quantitative methods to analyse tax havens (i.e. the "OECD havens", plus Singapore and Hong Kong).

(†) Tax havens that were in the 41 from the Hines-Rice 1994 list, but not in the 35 from the OECD 2000 list (the largest), which include the four "OECD tax havens".
(♣) Tax havens that were in the 35 from the OECD 2000 list (the largest), but not in the 41 from the Hines-Rice 1994 list.

Bibliography

See also

Mihir A. Desai
James R. Hines Jr.
Gabriel Zucman
Base erosion and profit shifting
Tax haven
Double Irish, Single Malt, and CAIA, BEPS tools

References

External links
Dhammika Dharmapala, PROFILE: National Bureau of Economic Research
Dhammika Dharmapala, Julius Kreeger Professor of Law, Chicago University Law School

1970 births
20th-century American economists
21st-century American economists
Living people
Sinhalese academics
Sri Lankan economists
University of California, Berkeley alumni
University of Chicago Law School faculty
University of Western Australia alumni
Corporate tax avoidance
Corporate taxation in the United States
Tax evasion
Naturalized citizens of the United States